Fernando Montero Mata (born 1 November 1948) is a retired Costa Rican football striker.

Club career
Nicknamed Macho, Montero most prominently played for Herediano with whom he won three league titles and became the league's top goalscorer in 1974 with 19 goals.

He also played for hometown club Limonense and had spells abroad in El Salvador, Guatemala, South Africa anD the United States.

International career
Montero represented Costa Rica in the 1976 and 1980 Olympic Games qualifiers and earned a total of 10 caps, scoring 2 goals.

Personal life
Born in Limón to Emilio Montero and Consuelo Mata,"Macho" is married to Francini Soto Arguedas and they have 4 children.

References

External links
 Profile - Herediano

1948 births
Living people
People from Limón Province
Association football forwards
Costa Rican footballers
Costa Rica international footballers
C.S. Cartaginés players
C.S. Herediano footballers
C.S.D. Municipal players
A.D. Carmelita footballers
C.D. Águila footballers
Costa Rican expatriate footballers
Expatriate footballers in El Salvador
Expatriate footballers in Guatemala
Expatriate soccer players in South Africa
Expatriate soccer players in the United States